The Piano Quartet in D minor by English composer William Walton was completed in 1919 when he was only 16 years old. Scored for piano, violin, viola, and cello, Walton later revised the work in 1921, 1955, and 1974-1975. It was first performed in Liverpool on September 19, 1924.

Structure 
The work is in four movements:

A typical performance of the quartet takes around 30 minutes.

Notable recordings 
Peter Donohoe, piano with members of the Maggini Quartet

References 

Compositions by William Walton